The Taff Vale Railway O2 class was a class of 0-6-2T steam tank locomotives designed by Tom Hurry Riches and introduced to the Taff Vale Railway in 1899.

Numbering

Withdrawal and disposal
All were withdrawn from traffic between 1926 and 1928. One locomotive, GWR 426 (TVR 85) was sold to the National Coal Board and used at their Philadelphia Colliery, numbered 52. It was subsequently saved for preservation, and is based at the Keighley and Worth Valley Railway. It was restored to original Taff Vale condition in 2000, although the paintwork didn't receive any lining out, and ran on a regular basis until 2009 when its boiler ticket expired. Due to its popularity and good condition, it received a further overhaul which was completed in February 2016, just in time for the line's Winter Steam Gala that year. This time though, the loco's paintwork received full lining out, effectively completing its original Taff Vale appearance. Since re-entering service, the loco remains part of the railway's operational fleet.

References

O2
0-6-2T locomotives
Neilson locomotives
Railway locomotives introduced in 1899
Standard gauge steam locomotives of Great Britain